Siphonops annulatus, the ringed caecilian, is a species of caecilian in the family Siphonopidae from South America. It might have the broadest known distribution among terrestrial caecilian species.

Description
Ringed caecilian measures  in total length. The body is cylindrical and slightly wider than deep. It is bluish-black to slate in colour. The annular grooves that completely encircle the body (except the 3–4 posteriormost ones) are edged in white or cream.

A team of scientists from Brazil and the United States discovered that these organisms have skin glands with different specialized functions. Glands on the head of the animals excrete lubricating mucous which may aid them in burrowing, while those on the tail region are packed with noxious chemicals, similar to the poison glands found in other amphibians such as toads and newts

Distribution and habitat
Widely distributed east of the Andes: originally discovered in Brazil, reported to exist in Argentina, Bolivia, Colombia, Ecuador, French Guiana, Guyana, Paraguay, Peru, Suriname, and Venezuela. Its natural habitats are subtropical or tropical moist lowland forest, dry savanna, moist savanna, subtropical or tropical moist shrubland, subtropical or tropical seasonally wet or flooded lowland grassland, pastureland, plantations, rural gardens, and heavily degraded former forest.

Reproduction
Nestlings are equipped with 44 spoon-shaped teeth to feed on the outer layer of their mother's skin. Young feed all at once for some seven minutes; then they all rest for three days as the female grows a new outer skin layer. This phenomenon is known as maternal dermatophagy. This practice and morphological similarities are shared with its African relative Boulengerula taitana, suggesting it evolved over 100 million years ago.

References

External links
 
 

annulatus
Amphibians of Argentina
Amphibians of Bolivia
Amphibians of Brazil
Amphibians of Colombia
Amphibians of Ecuador
Amphibians of French Guiana
Amphibians of Guyana
Amphibians of Paraguay
Amphibians of Peru
Amphibians of Suriname
Amphibians of Venezuela
Amphibians described in 1820
Taxonomy articles created by Polbot